Upper Pirkanmaa  is a subdivision of Pirkanmaa and one of the Sub-regions of Finland since 2009.

Municipalities
 Juupajoki
 Ruovesi
 Mänttä-Vilppula
 Virrat

Politics
Results of the 2018 Finnish presidential election:

 Sauli Niinistö   63.6%
 Laura Huhtasaari   8.5%
 Paavo Väyrynen   7.8%
 Pekka Haavisto   6.2%
 Matti Vanhanen   5.4%
 Tuula Haatainen   4.8%
 Merja Kyllönen   3.4%
 Nils Torvalds   0.3%

Sub-regions of Finland
Geography of Pirkanmaa